The Saros cycle series 120 for solar eclipses occurs at the Moon's descending node, repeating every 18 years, 11 days, containing 71 events. 55 of these are umbral eclipses. The series started with a partial solar eclipse on May 27, 933 AD, and transitioned into an annular eclipse on August 11, 1059. It was a hybrid event for 3 dates: May 8, 1510, through May 29, 1546, and are total eclipses from June 8, 1564 through March 30, 2033. The series ends at member 71 as a partial eclipse on July 7, 2195. The longest duration of totality was 2 minutes, 50 seconds on March 9, 1997. All eclipses in this series occurs at the Moon's descending node.

Umbral eclipses
Umbral eclipses (annular, total and hybrid) can be further classified as either: 1) Central (two limits), 2) Central (one limit) or 3) Non-Central (one limit). The statistical distribution of these classes in Saros series 120 appears in the following table.

Events

References 
 http://eclipse.gsfc.nasa.gov/SEsaros/SEsaros120.html

External links
Saros cycle 120 - Information and visualization

Solar saros series